Rere is a small community in the northeast of New Zealand's North Island. it is located in the upper valley of the Wharekōpae River in remote country in the foothills of the Huiarau Range, inland from Gisborne. It is notable for the Rere Falls and Rere Rock Slide, both on the Wharekopae River.

It is possible to walk behind its cascading curtain of water, although the rock face can be slippery.

Rere Rock Slide has been included in the NZ Automobile Association's 101 Must-do places for Kiwis. It can be slid down on boogie boards or tyres.

Parks

Rere Falls and the neighbouring Rere Reserve includes a walkway, cycleway and picnic area with public toilets, and a waterway for swimming and trout fishing.

Education

Rere School is a Year 1-8 co-educational state primary school.

References

External links
 Stoked for Saturday

Populated places in the Gisborne District